"You Don't Count the Cost" is a song written by Tom Shapiro, Chris Waters and Bucky Jones, and originally recorded by American country music artist Ricky Skaggs on his 1991 album My Father's Son.  The song was recorded later that year by American country music artist Billy Dean.  It was released in September 1991 as the first single from the album Billy Dean.  The song reached number 4 on the Billboard Hot Country Singles & Tracks chart.

Chart performance

Year-end charts

References

1991 singles
Ricky Skaggs songs
Billy Dean songs
Songs written by Bucky Jones
Songs written by Tom Shapiro
Songs written by Chris Waters
Capitol Records Nashville singles
Song recordings produced by Tom Shapiro
1991 songs